Yantang may refer to the following locations in China:

 Yantang, Guangxi (燕塘镇), town in Zhongshan County
 Yantang, Hunan (严塘镇), town in Chaling County, Hunan
 Yantang, Xinshao (严塘镇), a town of Xinshao County, Hunan